This is a list of cathedrals in Estonia sorted geographically.

See also

List of churches in Estonia
List of cathedrals (international)

References

 
Cathedrals
Estonia
Cathedrals